Mambu is a German software company founded in Berlin and headquartered in Amsterdam. Mambu provides infrastructure for banks and financial service providers according to the software as a service (SaaS) model. In December 2021, Mambu reached a company valuation of $5.3 billion, making it one of the unicorns of Germany.

Mambu traces its origins to a platform for microloans and serves neobanks such as Solarisbank and N26, as well as established credit institutions such as Banco Santander and companies such as Check24. The company generates most of its revenue outside of Germany. As of early 2021, the company had nearly 170 business customers in 50 countries.

History 
Mambu was founded in 2011 by Frederik Pfisterer and Eugene Danilkis, who had developed technical infrastructure for microfinanciers in Latin America and Africa. The company's first clients were mainly from emerging markets. Early backers included Commerzbank and Berlin-based venture capitalist Point Nine.

In 2016, the German neobank N26 became a Mambu customer. Solarisbank also relies to a significant extent on Mambu's software.

In June 2021, Mambu raised nearly €200 million in a financing round led by EQT Partners.

According to Handelsblatt, contracted annual recurring revenue is estimated at $165 million for 2022.

References 

German companies established in 2011
Companies based in Berlin
Software companies established in 2011
Software companies of Germany